is a television program in Japan providing a digest of the games of the summer National High School Baseball Championship, produced through a collaboration of TV Asahi and Asahi Broadcasting Corporation (ABC), and is shown as part of the ANN program.

Although this program was broadcast from the convention of 1981 of start time when the game of the day was called off because of serious calamities, such as heavy rain or a typhoon, and an earthquake, if applied by the convention of 1988 When the game of the day was called off because of the relation of the above natural situations, broadcast of a program also changed from the convention of 1989 to the example considered as a pause on that day.

The broadcast on 2004 August 18 was for 30 minutes starting at 5:05 AM because due to the Athens Olympic Games relay broadcast. (In the beginning, it was scheduled for 4:30 AM, as a measure by relay deployment, it wound beforehand for certain 35 minutes, and has fallen, and a part of program which was due to be broadcast to the next of this program was broadcast later.)

All the past casters 
 From Tokyo
 Keikichi Morishita(1988)
 Mina Nagashima(1998,1999,2001-)
 Junko Yaginuma(2000) etc...
 From Osaka
 Makoto Ashizawa(1991,1992) etc...

Sponsor 
 Matsushita Electric Industrial Co., Ltd.(1981-1988)
 Coca-Cola(1988-)
 Matsushita Electric Industrial Co., Ltd. and Coca-Cola were the official sponsors at the time of the broadcast in 1988. It became the independent sponsor of Coca-Cola from the time of the broadcast in 1989. Although it was temporarily two or more official sponsors centering on Coca-Cola, it became the independent sponsor of Coca-Cola from the time of the broadcast in 2003 again. (However, when Coca-Cola is an independent sponsor, a "Coca-Cola summer special" enters in front of "Netto Koshien".) In addition, sponsors other than Coca-Cola were as follows. (Both are temporary things)
 P&G
 Taisho Pharmaceutical Co., Ltd.
 Momoya
 Calbee
 Mazda
 Mitsubishi Motors
 Yamaha Corporation
 Alico Japan
 Reve21
 Hokka Hokka Tei
 avex trax
 Glico
 Yamahisa
 Okamura

References

External links
 ABC Netto Koshien Home Page(It exists only in summer.)

High school baseball in Japan
Japanese sports television series
Baseball television series